This is a list of episodes of the 1977–84 television series Fantasy Island. This series consists of two 2-hour TV movies and seven seasons of 1-hour episodes. The 1-hour episodes have multiple titles, referencing the simultaneous storylines contained within.

Series overview

TV movies

Episodes

Season 1 (1978)

Season 2 (1978–79)

Season 3 (1979–80)

Season 4 (1980–81)

Season 5 (1981–82)

Season 6 (1982–83)

Season 7 (1983–84)

References
 

Fantasy Island
Fantasy Island (1977 series)